Wildner is a surname. Notable people with the surname include:

 Johannes Wildner (born 1956), Austrian conductor, professor, and violinist
 Martina Wildner (born 1968, Allgäu), German female writer

References

German-language surnames